Loyalties is a novel by Raymond Williams, first published in 1985. 

A political drama that begins in 1936 and extends to the 1980s.  How a small group, some from very privileged backgrounds and some working-class militants, react first to the rise of Fascism, then the war, then the changing of alignments during the Cold War. There is suspicion that some of them were doing a lot more than they admitted to their friends.  Suspicions of personal and political betrayal.

British political novels
1985 British novels
Chatto & Windus books
Novels by Raymond Williams
Welsh novels